MYmta is a mobile application-based passenger information display system developed by the Metropolitan Transportation Authority (MTA) of New York City. While other applications exist which serve similar functions, MYmta is an all-in-one source for data provided directly by the MTA.

Functionality 
MYmta is intended to combine MTA functionalities that are already available in separate apps such as Subway Time, Bus Time, and the Long Island Rail Road (LIRR) and Metro-North Railroad Train Time applications into one all-encompassing application. The app also includes trip planning and paratransit functionalities, and will eventually include fare payment options as well.

Since its launch, the app has been in the testing phase, and thus the MTA is seeking feedback from users on what functionality customers would like to see included in the application.

Live information 
Similar to the MTA's Subway Time app, MYmta includes live subway arrival times. Similarly, the app also includes live bus arrival times and map tracking with functionality similar to that found in the MTA Bus Time app.

Trip planning 
Unlike previous iterations of MTA trip planners, the version included within MYmta also supports modes of transportation not operated by the MTA, such as the Staten Island Ferry, NYC Ferry, PATH, and NJ Transit services. MYmta can also save users' favorite trips, stations, and stops, so information about them can be accessed quickly.

The app also displays up-to-date information about delays and service changes so users can plan trips accordingly.

Paratransit and accessibility 
MYmta allows paratransit users to request services through Access-A-Ride, the MTA's paratransit offering.

In addition, the app reports statuses and outages of elevators and escalators in accessible stations, extending the functionality also performed by the similarly named My MTA Alerts service into application form.

Fare payment 
, the app itself does not support any direct fare payment systems. However, it does link to the MTA eTix app for LIRR and Metro-North services after the user has chosen a route. Once the app leaves beta testing, though, the MTA has announced plans to combine eTix functionality into the MYmta app.

In the future, the MTA also intends to add bus and subway fare payment options to the application as part of its new OMNY fare payment system.

History 
The MTA began testing MYmta in April 2018 as a replacement for its existing suite of applications.

The beta version app was released on July 2, 2018, and it was largely received positively. John Hatchett, an Access-A-Ride user, commented, "I've really felt like we've been listened to about not only what's not working but what we would like to see to make it work better." Transit journalist Jason Rabinowitz commented: "the fact that [the MTA] launched its new app with an outdated subway map is just so deliciously good that I may skip lunch today." However, the New York City Transit chief customer officer Sarah Meyer stated that this was because "updating the map would have jeopardized the launch date" of the app.

References

External links 

 Official site

Bus transportation in New York City
Products introduced in 2018
Metropolitan Transportation Authority
New York City Subway fare payment
MTA Regional Bus Operations